This is a list of speakers of the House of Assembly of Bermuda:

Sources
Official website

Bermuda
House of Assembly, Speakers